The 2019 ITTF Team World Cup (also known as the ZEN-NOH 2019 ITTF Team World Cup for sponsorship reasons) was a table tennis competition that took place in Tokyo, Japan, from 6 to 10 November 2019. It was the 12th edition of the ITTF-sanctioned event, and also served as one of the test events for the 2020 Summer Olympics.

China won both events, defeating South Korea in the men's team final and Japan in the women's team final.

Medallists

Qualification

The host nation Japan, and each of the current continental team champions qualified for both the men's and women's events, with additional places awarded to the highest-placed teams at the 2018 World Team Championships that had not already qualified through continental events.

Men

Women

Notes

Men's team

Seeding

Teams were seeded based on the latest ITTF World Team Ranking.

Group stage

The group stage took place on 6 and 7 November.

Group A

Group B

Group C

Group D

Knockout stage

The knockout stage took place from 7 to 10 November.

Women's team

Seeding

Teams were seeded based on the latest ITTF World Team Ranking.

Group stage

The group stage took place on 6 and 7 November.

Group A

Group B

Group C

Group D

Knockout stage

The knockout stage took place from 8 to 10 November.

See also
2019 World Table Tennis Championships
2019 ITTF World Tour
2019 ITTF Men's World Cup
2019 ITTF Women's World Cup

References

External links
 Tournament page on ITTF website

Team
World Cup (team)
ITTF Team World Cup
Table tennis competitions in Japan
Sports competitions in Tokyo
ITTF Team World Cup
ITTF Team World Cup